Acronicta modica, the hesitant dagger, is a moth of the family Noctuidae. It is found in eastern North America from Nova Scotia to Florida, west to Oklahoma and Texas.

The wingspan is around 35 mm. The larvae feed on Oak species.

The type specimen of Acronicta modica was recently determined to be Acronicta haesitata. Because of priorities of the species descriptions, this resulted in Acronicta modica, the medium dagger moth, being renamed Acronicta immodica, and Acronicta haesitata, the hesitant dagger moth, becoming Acronicta modica. Acronicta haesitata is now a taxonomic synonym of Acronicta modica.

References

External links
Species info
Moths of Maryland

Acronicta
Moths of North America
Moths described in 1856